Curçay-sur-Dive (literally Curçay on Dive) is a commune in the Vienne department in the Nouvelle-Aquitaine region in western France.

History
Curçay grew up where the Dive could be forded; the ford was replaced at an early time by the Gallo-Roman bridge that in medieval times came to be ascribed to the intervention of Queen Blanche.

Demographics

See also
Communes of the Vienne department

References

Communes of Vienne